In algebra, a cyclic division algebra is one of the basic examples of a division algebra over a field, and plays a key role in the theory of central simple algebras.

Definition 
Let A be a finite-dimensional central simple algebra over a field F. Then A is said to be cyclic if it contains a strictly maximal subfield E such that E/F is a cyclic field extension (i.e., the Galois group is a cyclic group).

See also 
 Factor system#Cyclic algebras - cyclic algebras described by factor systems.
 Brauer group#Cyclic algebras - cyclic algebras are representative of Brauer classes.

References 
 
 

Algebra